Arts & Letters is an American semiannual literary journal, published by Georgia College & State University in Milledgeville, Georgia.

Established in 1999, the journal is known for its in-depth interviews with major American writers, including John Guare, Tina Howe, Bobbie Ann Mason and Charles Simic.  Notable contributors to the journal have included K. E. Allen, Jacob M. Appel, Julianna Baggot, James Doyle, Janice Eidus, Patricia Foster, Nola Garrett, Bob Hicok, Stephen Graham Jones, Rachel Kadish, Evan Lavender-Smith, Ira Sukrungruang and Kirk M. Wright.

Masthead
, the staff included:

 Editor Laura Newbern
 Fiction Editor Allen Gee
 Nonfiction Editor Peter Selgin
 Poetry Editor Laura Newbern
 Associate Editor Alice Friman

See also

 List of literary magazines
 List of United States magazines

References

External links
 al.gcsu.edu, the magazine's official website

1999 establishments in Georgia (U.S. state)
Literary magazines published in the United States
Biannual magazines published in the United States
English-language magazines
Georgia (U.S. state) culture
Georgia College & State University
Magazines established in 1999
Magazines published in Georgia (U.S. state)